Michael P. Farris (born August 27, 1951) is an American lawyer. He is a founder of the Home School Legal Defense Association (HSLDA) and Patrick Henry College, which share a campus in Purcellville (Loudoun County), Virginia. From 2017 through 2022, he was CEO of and general counsel for Alliance Defending Freedom.

Early life and education 
Farris graduated, magna cum laude, with Bachelor of Arts degree in political science from Western Washington University (formerly Western Washington State College). He then earned a Juris Doctor from the Gonzaga University School of Law. Farris received an LL.M. in public international law from the University of London in 2011.

Career 
In 1983, Farris founded the Home School Legal Defense Association, serving as chairman and general counsel. Farris founded Patrick Henry College, a Christian college, in 2000. He held the positions of president and professor of government from 2000 to 2006. Farris resigned his position as president of HSLDA to take on these new roles. In March 2006, Farris stepped down from the position of president to become chancellor of the college. In January 2017, Farris retired from the position of chancellor but retained the title of "chancellor emeritus."

Legal and political career 
As a lawyer, Farris' cases include over 40 reported decisions as lead counsel. These decisions were given by the United States Supreme Court, five U.S. circuit courts of Appeal, seven state Supreme Courts, and five state Courts of Appeal. Farris has argued for the petitioners in the Supreme Court cases Witters v. Washington Department of Services For the Blind in 1985–1986 and National Institute of Family and Life Advocates v. Becerra in 2018.

In 1993, Farris ran unsuccessfully for lieutenant governor of Virginia and was defeated by Democrat Don Beyer, 54–46 percent. However, fellow Republicans George Allen and James Gilmore were elected on the same ballot as Governor and Attorney General, respectively. Farris' close connection to conservative leaders like Jerry Falwell of the former Moral Majority, Pat Robertson of the Christian Coalition and Phyllis Schlafly of the Eagle Forum stirred deep-seated feelings about religion and politics. These concerns, inflamed by negative ads by Beyer to portray him even more radically, likely caused alienation of enough moderate voters to cause his defeat.

In 2009 and 2010, Farris represented the plaintiffs in Clemons, John T., Et Al. v. Dept. of Commerce, Et Al., which was dismissed on appeal to the Supreme Court. Apportionment.us brought the case in attempt to apply the "One Man, One Vote" principle of Baker v. Carr to the relative size of congressional districts across state lines. That would have had the effect of expanding the size of the United States House of Representatives beyond its current 435 members.

Along with Mark Meckler, Farris was co-founder of the Convention of States Project, founded in 2013 to encourage a convention to propose amendments to the Constitution. He served as senior fellow for constitutional studies for the project's parent organization, Citizens for Self-Governance, and as a member of CSG's legal board of reference.

Alliance Defending Freedom announced that Farris would become its CEO and general counsel in January 2017.

After Donald Trump lost the 2020 presidential election and refused to concede while making claims of fraud, Farris worked behind the scenes on legal documents filed by Texas attorney general Ken Paxton to overturn the election results.

On October 1, 2022, Kristen Waggoner succeeded Farris as CEO and President of ADF, retaining her role as General Counsel.

Personal life 
He married in 1971 and has 10 children and 22 grandchildren. (see: Quiverfull)

References

External links
 Michael P. Farris, Esq.
 

|-

|-

1951 births
Alumni of the University of London
Alliance Defending Freedom people
American legal scholars
Baptist ministers from the United States
Gonzaga University School of Law alumni
Governmental studies academics
Homeschooling advocates
Living people
Patrick Henry College faculty
People from Purcellville, Virginia
Presidents of Patrick Henry College
Virginia lawyers
Virginia Republicans
Western Washington University alumni
Baptists from Virginia
American political activists
Conservatism in the United States